Uneasy Listening is a compilation album by anarcho-punk band Chumbawamba. It contains songs from the time of their first album Pictures of Starving Children Sell Records up to 1998.

Release
The album was released in the United States in 1998, to expose American audiences to the group's music before "Tubthumping," as their preceding studio albums had received only a limited stateside release and the record labels were being uncooperative with regards to the group's preceding albums there. The album compiles songs from the group's pre-Tubthumper albums, from Pictures of Starving Children Sell Records to Swingin' with Raymond, although the majority of the songs are from the group's two preceding albums, Anarchy and Swingin' with Raymond. However, the album contains one previously-unreleased song, "We Don't Go to God's House Anymore", which is based on a tune derived from the Alabama 3 song "U Don't Danse 2 Tekno Anymore".

The cover photograph depicts Buenaventura Durruti, an anarchist soldier and revolutionary who died fighting fascists in Spain in 1936.

The album was initially released in 1998 as a German import, although it was re-released in 1999 and 2001 by EMI Music Distribution.

Critical reception

The album elicited highly favorable reviews upon its release. Music critic Robert Christgau gave the album a grade of an "A−" and praised the album as "funny," opining that the collection also demonstrates that their music was "catchy" long before "Tubthumping" and noting that "the notes (in the booklet) are worth reading." AllMusic awarded the album four out of five stars and praised the collection's inclusion of "Ugh! Your Ugly Houses," also commenting that "if you don't have the studio albums, this is the best place to start." In the Rolling Stone Album Guide, the album holds a score of three and a half stars; critic Douglas Wolk felt that the album contains the group's "angriest," "funniest," and "most tuneful" songs in the group's repertoire, singling out the lyric "Nothing ever burns down by itself/Every fire needs a little bit of help" as the single best line on the record.

Track listing
All tracks written and produced by Chumbawamba except where noted.

References

Chumbawamba albums
1998 compilation albums